Keli Scott McGregor (January 23, 1963 – April 20, 2010) was a  professional football player in the NFL and was president of the Colorado Rockies from 2001 until his death.

School sport
McGregor was a multi-sport athlete at Lakewood High School in Colorado before starring with the Colorado State Rams football team as a tight end. McGregor was a four-year starter at Colorado State University. Considered to be an undersized halfback when he arrived on campus, McGregor went from freshman walk-on to second-team all-American tight end in 1984. He grew to 6 ft 8 in and 250 lb, and went on to become an all-Western Athletic Conference tight end from 1982 to 1984. He set a single-season school record with 69 catches in 1983, a mark that stood for ten years. He was voted to Colorado State's all-century team in 1992 and was named to the CSU Hall of Fame in 1996.

Professional career
McGregor was selected by Denver in the fourth round of the 1985 NFL draft and played for the Denver Broncos and the Indianapolis Colts during the 1985 NFL season.

Coaching and management
Following his retirement from football, McGregor then embarked on a career in sports administration. While he earned a master's degree in education with an emphasis on athletic administration, McGregor served as an administrative assistant and football coach for two years at the University of Florida (1988-89). After his time at Florida, McGregor went to the University of Arkansas for four years (1989-93), elevating to the position of associate athletic director in 1992.

He joined Colorado Rockies in October 1993 as senior director of operations. He was promoted to senior vice-president in 1996 and executive vice-president in 1998. He was named president of the team in 2001.

Death

On April 20, 2010, he was found dead at the age of 47 in a Salt Lake City hotel room while on a business trip. He was in his seventeenth season with the Rockies, his ninth as club president. Initial indications were that he died of natural causes. Other major figures in the game paid tribute to him as the news of his death became public.

On August 30, 2010 it was announced that McGregor died of a rare virus that infected his heart muscle.  The infection caused lymphatic myocarditis, killing an otherwise healthy McGregor.  "In an unusual manifestation of a viral illness, this organism infiltrated his heart muscle and disrupted the electrical pathways that signal the heart to beat properly," a statement from his family said. "The heart muscle may have recovered from the viral attack had these electrical pathways not been destroyed, but the muscle may have been permanently weakened and destined for eventual heart failure."  It continued, "Just as a healthy brain can be infected with viral meningitis, a healthy heart can be infected with viral myocarditis," the McGregor family stated. "Fortunately, the vast majority of viral illnesses do not damage the heart or the brain."  

During one of the final home games of the 2010 season, the Rockies honored McGregor by placing his initials amongst the retired numbers at Coors Field.

References

External links
Pro-Football-Reference
Online Memorial Page

1963 births
2010 deaths
American football tight ends
People from O'Brien County, Iowa
People from Lakewood, Colorado
Colorado Rockies executives
Denver Broncos players
Indianapolis Colts players
Major League Baseball team presidents
Colorado State Rams football players